Wugai Mountain Hunting Field is located close to Chenzhou, in Hunan Province in China.

This park space is a hunting area where several different kinds of animals may be hunted. It has an area of 80 square kilometres. 

The Wugai Mountain Hunting Field is one of the only two hunting fields in China. It is also the sole hunting-permitted area south of the Yangtze.

Vegetation and Wildlife

Forests covers approximately 78 per cent of the total area of the Wugai Mountain Hunting Field. A total of 130 species of animals have been recorded from this area, almost all of them existing in substantial numbers. Out of the 130, only 26 species are allowed to be hunted. Some of these include the sambar, wild boar, South China rabbit and badger.

Climate

The Wugai Mountain Hunting Field has a mild climate and temperatures do not go to the extreme in either winter or summer, making it popular among holidayers, adventure seekers, and scientists alike.

See also
 Wugai Mountain

References

External links
 Local government website

Tourist attractions in Hunan
Parks in Hunan